Foolad Khuzestan B Football Club (Bashgah-e Futbal-e Fulâd-e Nevin Xuzestan) is an Iranian football club, based in Ahvaz, Khuzestan. They are the reserve side of Persian Gulf Pro League club Foolad, and currently compete in the Azadegan League. The club has a policy to only sign players from the province of Khuzestan, to promote the growth of local talent.

In the summer of 2015, Foolad Novin changed its name to Foolad Khuzestan B.

History

Establishment
Foolad Novin was formed in 2008 with the aim of supporting feeder club Foolad. The relationship was built as a foundation for the development of football and coaching in Khuzestan province. The club started with the acquisition of Dayhim Ahvaz F.C. license, a club which played in the 2nd Division in 2008.

Promotion to Azadegan League
With players explicitly from Khuzestan province, the club started play in the 2nd Division, with good performances and results the club reached the second stage. Foolad continued with good performances and finished second in Group 1 and were promoted to the Azadegan League.

2nd Division and Return
Foolad Novin started the next season in the Azadegan League poorly and were relegated back to the 2nd Division. After four years of playing in the 2nd Division with average results, Foolad Novin was again promoted back to the Azadegan League for the 2014-15 Azadegan League season. With good planning from the technical staff and the policy of signing talent of Foolad the team performed well and finished first. On 9 May 2015 Foolad Novin defeated Siah Jamegan 1–0 in the final of the Azadegan League to become champions of the league for the first time in their history.

The club sold their rights in the Persian Gulf Pro League to Esteghlal Ahvaz, because two teams from the same club can not play in the same league, Foolad was already in the top flight so Foolad Novin assumed Esteghlal's position in the 2nd Division.

Season-by-season
The table below chronicles the achievements of Foolad Novin in various competitions since 2007.

Players

First-team squad
As of June 29, 2016

Honours

Domestic
Azadegan League:
 Winners (1): 2014–15

See also
 2013–14 Hazfi Cup
 2013–14 Iran Football's 2nd Division

References

External links
  Foolad F.C. Official Website
  Players and Results

 

Association football clubs established in 2008
Sport in Ahvaz
2008 establishments in Iran